The motion_invest Arena is a multi-use stadium in Maria Enzersdorf - Südstadt, Austria (Johann Steinböck-Straße).  It is currently used mostly for football matches and is the home ground of VfB Admira Wacker Mödling.  The stadium holds 10,600.

References

FC Admira Wacker Mödling
Football venues in Austria
Sports venues in Lower Austria